Delilah & Julius is a Canadian animated series targeted at children as well as teenagers and adults, and animated using Macromedia Flash technology. It premiered on Canada's Teletoon animation channel. Delilah and Julius was produced by Decode Entertainment and Collideascope Digital Productions. 52 episodes were produced.

The series centers on a pair of highly trained young adults, Delilah and Julius, who were both orphaned children of special agents. Together, they graduated from the Academy, a training facility headed by Al, a free-spirited special agent who brought the duo together, and fight international crime and a myriad of villains as a pair of savvy, well-trained spies.

Characters

Main characters
As a team, Delilah and Julius are both gifted musicians, masters of disguise, martial arts experts, and fluent in 20 languages. Still, they are both consummate professionals always seeking to improve their game. They seem to like each other, too. Delilah and Julius have had many "dates" like missions.

Delilah Devonshire
Delilah Devonshire has a very determined personality and is eager for truth. In fact, Delilah's greatest quality is her commitment to truth. It's also what gets her into trouble. She takes things seriously but she can break down easily in certain situations. Her spy parents went missing when she was only 5 and are presumed dead. Delilah does not believe this, however, and she is determined to find out anything she can about them and to prove the rumors wrong that her parents were double agents. Delilah's relationship with Julius is very important to her and she is very touchy and gets jealous when Julius flirts with other girls (especially Ice). She appreciates having a capable partner in Julius, and together they will stop at nothing to keep the villains from carrying out their evil plots on mankind. She believes in breaking her opponent down from the inside out. She gets inside the villain's head and she loves a new challenge. Delilah is strong-willed, inventive, resourceful, quick-thinking, and graceful. She is experienced in fencing, etiquette, and explosives, and always has time to learn something new that may be useful on a mission.

Julius Chevalier
Julius Chevalier is often flippant, but is very determined and has a passion for crime-fighting. Where Delilah is more goal-oriented, Julius is more spontaneous. He deals with situations as they happen and still manages to find the time to have fun. He enjoys surfing, poetry, safe cracking and yoga. His parents were killed in action when he was only four, and Julius would love to avenge their deaths. For now, he is comforted by the fact that they were considered two of the greatest spies of all time. Julius is a laid-back guy and a little cocky. This confidence allows him to act on the fly. He has a dash of James Bond in that he is not easily ruffled, thinks fast, and makes it all look easy. He has a good sense of humor and is very intuitive when it comes to the needs of his partner, Delilah. Beneath a nonchalant, arrogant exterior lies a sensitive and caring guy – especially towards Delilah. He is calm and resourceful under pressure but tends to be a bit careless when the pressure is off. He often tries to impress Delilah, and becomes extremely jealous and petty when she shows interest in other boys. It is proved in one episode that he is in love with Delilah as it is shown what he is dreaming about.

The Academy Crew

Alfred "Al"
The director of the Academy, Al is always highly informed and gives Delilah and Julius their mission assignments. Al's not only their primary contact, guide, and teacher, but he is also a parental figure for Delilah and Julius. A free-spirited individual, Al talks like a mid-'70s Californian hippie. He is passionate about food and culture and has a unique sense of humour, but can also be serious, especially when it comes to keeping his students safe.

Scarlett Vance
Scarlett is the Academy's gadget guru. Like Al, Scarlett is prone to using anachronistic '70s expressions as well as cares a lot about her students. She is fully inventive and always coming up with new spy technology that keeps Delilah and Julius on head of their missions

Buster "Nosey"
A frequent partner of Delilah and Julius, he is a well-meaning, good-hearted goof with a reputation for being a stink magnet. It's not that he is really stinky, he is just inevitably drawn into very smelly situations on his missions. Nosey seems to be attracted to Zoe, a new member of the Academy.

Ursula and Emmet
Another one of Al's arranged spy teams, Ursula and Emmet are the rivals of Delilah and Julius who are jealous of their popularity and success. Ursula is also a double agent working undercover at the Academy for an unknown evil foe.

Zoe Ling
Zoe is the newest Chinese spy at the Academy. She likes to read comics and knows them all by enthusiasm. When Zoe first arrives at the Academy, she thinks Julius is cute. However, a relationship with Nosey is revealed throughout a few episodes. Zoe is a redhead and has a rather feisty personality which is the stereotypical attitude most redheads have. Her espionage skills are well-developed and the Academy Crew seems to trust this newcomer.

Villains
 Dr. Dismay: Dr. Dismay is a young, handsome doctor bent on world domination who tries hard to break the stereotypical mold of a mad scientist. With his evil sidekick "Nurse" he tries to stop Delilah and Julius using his bad medication.
 Professor Dismay: An evil genius and father of Dr. Dismay.
 Dexter Jeremy Hook "DJ Hook": An internationally-known DJ tries to dominate the world. A big advantage for him is that he can hypnotize people with his music. Delilah and Julius can usually maneuver around it and stop the evil DJ.
 Ms. Deeds: The leader of a crime syndicate specializing in cybercrime.
 Ice: A master manipulator of earth science who also has her eyes on Julius.
 Wednesday Kertsfield: A young socialite who uses her money to try to take over the world.
 Conman: A master of disguise, he is behind some of the biggest scams ever committed against humanity. Nobody has ever seen his real face, not even any of his many kidnapping victims. Delilah and Julius uncovered his face, but instead of having a face the conman wore a permanent mask.
 Baguio Joe: A volatile weatherman who really controls the weather. 
 Gilly Hippodrome: A mutant who hates normal-looking people. He is also the leader of a group of freaks masquerading as a circus, where he is the "Clown Prince".
 Ursula: Although a member of the academy, she is working as a double agent.
 Tibor: He is after the zero list and is also Julius' brother.
 Sunshine: Ice's twin sister and a villain with a fiery attitude
 Dollface and Roy: A woman who is part-robot, part-human, and wants to take over the world with her "husband", full-time robot, Roy. She wants the entire world to be of robots, and no humans at all.
 Evil Eye and Francis: Evil eye lost his eye while trying to escape from the police, and he believes that he lost it because of Delilah. Francis is his sidekick.

Episodes
Two seasons were produced, each consisting of 26 episodes. Each season includes a three-part finale, originally aired together under one title but later as separate episodes.

"The Underground" is the pilot episode for the series.

Series overview

Season 1 (2005–06)

Season 2 (2007–08)

Production
Development of the series began in early 2002, with 13 episodes budgeted at US$200,000–300,000 each. Originally, the show was aimed at the teenage girl demographic with a very different concept for the main characters, "a brawn-and-brains husband-and-wife team of self-made millionaires".

By 2005, the first season had expanded to 26 episodes in production, with a budget of $1.2 million. At the time, the premise of the series involved the title characters "fighting crimes of conformity" around the world.

Home video releases
Delilah and Julius - The Complete First Season was released September 9, 2008. The DVD set contains the first 13 episodes in both English and French and has a run time of 290 minutes. Special features include character biographies, a spy gadget gallery, and the original English-language script for the pilot episode "The Underground".

An official YouTube channel run by WildBrain Spark began uploading episodes on May 31, 2019.

The full series has been released on CraveTV.

Reception
The series was one of the top-rated shows on the English-language Teletoon in May 2006, and the 10th most popular original production on the French-language Télétoon as of October 2007.

The pilot episode was reviewed by the Edmonton Journal and The Sydney Morning Herald. Kidscreen compared the show to Totally Spies!, another Teletoon original, but with "a more sophisticated sense of humor focused on relationship-building" aiming for an older audience.

Awards and nominations

References

External links
 
 Distribution website

2000s Canadian animated television series
2005 Canadian television series debuts
2008 Canadian television series endings
Canadian children's animated action television series
Canadian children's animated adventure television series
Canadian children's animated science fiction television series
Canadian flash animated television series
English-language television shows
Fictional couples
Teletoon original programming
Television series by DHX Media
Television shows set in Nova Scotia